Bajestan County is in Razavi Khorasan province, Iran. The capital of the county is the city of Bajestan. At the 2006 census, the region's population (as Bajestan District of Gonabad County) was 29,495 in 8,098 households. The following census in 2011 counted 30,664 people in 9,244 households, by which time the district had been separated from the county to form Bajestan County. At the 2016 census, the county's population was 31,207 in 10,011 households.

Administrative divisions

The population history and structural changes of Bajestan County's administrative divisions over three consecutive censuses are shown in the following table. The latest census shows two districts, four rural districts, and two cities.

References

 

Counties of Razavi Khorasan Province